

Portugal
 Angola – Manuel de Almeida e Vasconcelos, Governor of Angola (1790–1797)
 Macau – Jose Manuel Pinto, Governor of Macau (1793–1797)
 Moçambique – Diogo de Sousa Coutinho, Governor of Moçambique, the Zambezi and Sofala (1793–1797)

Kingdom of Great Britain
 New South Wales – John Hunter commissioned as Governor but did not arrive in the colony until 1795
India – 
Charles Cornwallis, 1st Marquess Cornwallis, Governor-General of India (1786–1794)
John Shore, 1st Baron Teignmouth, Governor-General of India (1794–1797)

Colonial governors
Colonial governors
1794

Kingdom of Spain
New Spain–
Juan Vicente Gúemes, 2nd Count of Revillagigedo, Viceroy of New Spain (17 October 1789–11 July 1794
Miguel de la Grúam Talamanca 1st Marquis of Branciforte, Viceroy of New Spain (12 July 1794–31 May 1798)

Viceroyalty of Peru–Francisco Gil de Taboada, Viceroy of Peru, (25 March 1790–6 June 1796)

Viceroyalty of New Granada–José Manuel de Ezpeleta, Viceroy of New Granada, (1789–1797)

Viceroyalty of Rio de la Plata–Nicolás Antonio de Arredondo, Viceroy of Rio de la Plata, (4 December 1789–16 March 1795)

Spanish Guinea–Vacant

Spanish Philippines–Rafael María de Aguilar y Ponce de León, Governor-General of the Philippines, (1 September 1793–6 August 1806)

Kingdom of the Netherlands
Dutch East Indies–Willem Arnold Alting, Governor-General of the Dutch East Indies, (1 September 1780–17 February 1797)
Dutch Cape Colony–Abraham Josias Sluysken, Governor of Cape Colony, (2 September 1793–14 September 1795)